The spring salamander (Gyrinophilus porphyriticus) is a species of salamander in the family Plethodontidae It is found in Canada and the United States. The generic name, Gyrinophilus, means "tadpole lover" and refers to the long period of time it spends as a gilled larva before maturing. The specific name, porphyriticus, is Latin from Greek, meaning the color of porphyry, a purple stone, and this salamander has also been called the purple salamander.

Its natural habitats are temperate forests, rivers, swamps, freshwater marshes, freshwater springs, inland karsts, and caves. In addition to insects, worms, and other small invertebrates, the fairly large spring salamander may also consume smaller stream dwelling salamanders such as two-lined and dusky salamanders.
In fact, they are considered salamander specialist in some areas such as the North Carolina Mountains, where 50% of their diets consist of other salamanders including their own kind

Although deforestation is a potential threat, the spring salamander occurs in many protected areas and is not listed as threatened in the IUCN Red List.

Description
Like all members of the family Plethodontidae these salamanders have a nasolabial groove. The light line from eye to nostril is bordered below by gray pigment, but the markings are not always conspicuous. The dorsal coloration varies from salmon or light brownish to pink or reddish. The ground color has a cloudy appearance, and the darker markings are vague. The subspecies G. p. danielsi and G. p. dunni can be . Adults reach larger sizes at higher elevations as a consequence of delay in development to maturity after metamorphosis in high-level populations. The white line from eye to nostril, bordered below by a conspicuous black or dark brown line, is distinctive. There also may be a dark line above the white line, often conspicuous. The dorsal coloration can be clear reddish, salmon, or orange-yellow marked with black or brown spots or flecks. 17 to 19 costal grooves. Larvae are aquatic and have stream-type morphology. Juveniles are typically more brightly colored than adults.

Habitat
This species is found in cool springs and mountain springs, but is also likely to be found in any wet depression beneath logs, stones, or leaves in the surrounding forest. They require being in areas that provide them with adequate oxygen and moisture because they conduct cutaneous respiration. During the colder months of the year, the salamanders will spend their time in wet soil close to a source of water where they remain somewhat active in burrows, or in the leaf litter near a stream or other body of water.

Geographic range
Its distribution ranges from southern Quebec to northern Alabama and extremely northeast Mississippi. There is also an isolated colony in Hamilton County, Ohio. G. p. duryi is present in southern Ohio, eastern Kentucky, West Virginia, and western Virginia.  The distribution range of G. p. danielsi is the southern Appalachian Mountains and the adjacent Piedmont from North Carolina to Alabama. G. p. dunni is distributed through the southern portion of the Blue Ridge Province and the Piedmont from southwest North Carolina to eastern to central Alabama. The nominate subspecies, G. p. porphyriticus, occupies the remainder of the geographical range of this species.

Reproduction 
Spring Salamanders commonly breed in late summer into fall. The courtship begins with the male sliding his head over the female's body. From there, a tail-straddle walk begins. This walk entails the female straddling the male's tail while both walk forward. From there, the male deposits the spermatophore on the substrate. The female then picks it up and will store it until ready to fertilize eggs. Once the spermatophore is deposited, the male walks forward with his tail standing straight up. He then proceeds to undulate his tail while the base of the tail touches the chin of the female. This causes the tail's base to rub over most of the female's chin.

The females will lay eggs in the summer following their mating. The eggs are sticky when laid and will allow the egg mass to adhere wherever applied. The egg mass can contain between 16-160 eggs. The females will protect this egg mass until they hatch, usually in late summer or early fall. The larvae may stay around the mother after hatching but do not directly depend on her. Larvae for this species remain in this larval stage for multiple years, some up to four years. It takes the post-metamorphosis individual another four years before reaching sexual maturity.

Predation and enemies 
Fish are the main predators of the spring salamander, including the Brook Trout (Salvelinus fontinalis). Survival of the spring salamander is reduced by over 50% in the presence of fingerling brook trout with an even greater reduction in the presence of adult fish. The growth of spring salamanders is reduced by as much as 90% in areas where spring salamanders and brook trout coexist. Enemies include the Ocoee salamander, who is more likely to flee when it encounters the spring salamander. Other predators of this species include the Eastern Garter Snake (Thamnophis sirtalis) and the Northern Water Snake (Nerodia sipedon). Larger specimens of this species will also exhibit cannibalism of smaller individuals.  This species will also put off a toxin through their skin to try and ward off predation.

Conservation status 
The IUCN Red List categorizes the Spring salamander as least concern, and the United States Federal list has no specific status noted for G. porphyriticus. However in the state of Connecticut G. porphyriticus is listed as threatened. These populations are threatened in Connecticut primarily due to deforestation, agriculture, and introduction of fish for sport such as trout.

Subspecies
Northern spring salamander (Gyrinophilus porphyriticus porphyriticus)
Kentucky spring salamander (Gyrinophilus porphyriticus duryi)
Blue Ridge spring salamander (Gyrinophilus porphyriticus danielsi)
Carolina spring salamander (Gyrinophilus porphyriticus dunni)

References

Further reading
Green, Jacob (1827). "An account of some new species of salamanders". Contributions of the Maclurian Lyceum to the Arts & Sciences 1: 3–8.
Conant, Roger, and Joseph T. Collins (1998). A Field Guide to Reptiles and Amphibians of Eastern and Central North America. Third Edition, Expanded. Boston: Houghton Mifflin Company.

External links
 NewScientist.com: Salamanders formed new species despite interbreeding
 Spring Salamander (Gyrinophilus porphyriticus), Natural Resources Canada

Gyrinophilus
Cave salamanders
Amphibians of Canada
Amphibians of the United States
Fauna of the Northeastern United States
Fauna of the Southeastern United States
Cenozoic amphibians of North America
Extant Pleistocene first appearances
Pleistocene animals of North America
Pleistocene United States
Taxonomy articles created by Polbot
Amphibians described in 1827